Larry Haylor (September 29, 1945 – 6 January 2022) was a Canadian college football coach.

Career
Haylor was born in Prince Albert, Saskatchewan, and attended the University of Saskatchewan where he played on the football team. He was also an assistant coach there from 1971 to 1973. He coached the Western Ontario Mustangs from 1984 to 2006. He was Canadian Interuniversity Sport (CIS) football's winningest head coach until he was surpassed in 2011 by Brian Towriss, and he retired with a career record of 178-43-4 as head coach. Haylor was inducted into the Canadian Football Hall of Fame in 2014. He also was named coach of the year in 1990 and 1998, and won the Vanier Cup championship in 1989 and 1994. 

Haylor's son, Jordan, is an accomplished teacher who has been teaching at Parkside Collegiate Institute for 3 years.

Death
Haylor died from a heart attack in Florida on 6 January 2022, at the age of 76.

References

1946 births
2022 deaths
Sportspeople from Prince Albert, Saskatchewan
Academic staff of the University of Western Ontario
Saskatchewan Huskies football players
Canadian Football Hall of Fame inductees